STUMP may refer to:
Smooth muscle tumor of uncertain malignant potential, a uterine tumor
Prostatic stromal tumour of uncertain malignant potential, a tumor of the prostate

See also
Stump (disambiguation)